Hamid Baeidinejad (born 11 October 1962 in Tehran) is an Iranian diplomat who served as the Iranian Ambassador to the United Kingdom from 2016 to 2021. He was formerly the Director-General for Political Affairs and International Security Affairs in the Ministry of Foreign Affairs.

Baeidinejad graduated from the Ministry of Foreign Affair's School of International Relations in 1989. He joined the Ministry of Foreign Affairs the same year and has worked for the ministry ever since, working in the field of disarmament. Baeidinejad served as one of Iran's negotiators in negotiations for curtailing Iran's nuclear program that lead to the Joint Comprehensive Plan of Action in 2015. He previously served in various capacities with Iran's missions to the United Nations, including a term from 2008-2011 as Iran's Ambassador and deputy Permanent Representative to the United Nations Office at Geneva.

References

External links

  on Instagram
  on Telegram (Channel)

Iranian diplomats
Iranian nuclear negotiators
Living people
1962 births